The International Racquetball Federation's 20th Racquetball World Championships were held in Guatemala City, Guatemala from November 26 to December 6. This is the first time Worlds have been in Guatemala, and the second consecutive time a Central American country has hosted the event after Costa Rica in 2018.

American Alejandro Landa won men's singles in Guatemala by defeating Costa Rican Andres Acuña in the final. Mexico born Landa was representing the USA for the first time at Worlds. Acuña was surprising finalist, and the first Costa Rican to reach the final. He claimed the 2nd seed position by winning pool B in the group stage of matches, including a win over defending champion Mexican Rodrigo Montoya.

Tournament format
The 2021 World Championships used a two stage format with an initial group stage that was a round robin with the results used to seed players for a medal round.

Group stage

Pool A

Pool B

Pool C

Pool D

Pool E

Pool F

Pool G

Note: Rafael Gatica replaced Pedro Castro, who was injured in the first match of the group against Javier Martinez after winning game one.

Medal round

References

Racquetball competitions